Rosters at the 2001 IIHF World Championship in Germany.

Czech Republic 

Source: IIHF.

Finland

Source: IIHF.

Sweden 

Source: IIHF.

USA

Source: IIHF.

Canada 

Source: IIHF.

Russia 

Source: IIHF.

Slovakia 

Source: IIHF.

Germany 

Source: IIHF.

Switzerland 

Source: IIHF.

Ukraine 

Source: IIHF.

Austria 

Source: IIHF.

Italy 

Source: IIHF.

Latvia 

Source: IIHF.

Belarus 

Source: IIHF.

Norway 

Source: IIHF.

Japan 

Source: IIHF.

References

External links

rosters
IIHF World Championship rosters